"Over and Over" is a song by American singer Puff Johnson. It was written by Phil Galdston, Reed Vertelney, and Alan Roy Scott and initially recorded for the soundtrack of the American comedy film The First Wives Club (1996). Production on the song was overseen by Keith Thomas. Released as a standalone single, it became a top-10 success in Norway and entered the top 20 of the UK Singles Chart. "Over and Over" was also included in several international editions of Johnson's only studio album, Miracle (1996).

Critical reception
A reviewer from Music Week rated the song four out of five, adding that "Columbia's push for the massive First Wives Club movie soundtrack guarantees major exposure for this potent mid-tempo R&B-styled pop song." In 1997, the magazine's Alan Jones wrote, "One of the most promising new R&B vocalists to emerge in 1996, Puff Johnson looks set for an early '97 hit with Over & Over. A true diva, Johnson's original version oozes class, but in order to make its passage to the UK chart smoother it has been given a fairly muscular house remix by Love To Infinity."

Track listings

Notes
 denotes additional producer

Credits and personnel
Credits lifted from the liner notes of Miracle.

 Phil Galdston – writer
 Puff Johnson – vocals
 Alan Roy Scott – writer

 Keith Thomas – arranger, producer
 Reed Vertelney – writer

Charts

Release history

References

Puff Johnson songs
1996 singles
1996 songs
Columbia Records singles